GG Bond Movie: Ultimate Battle is a 2015 Chinese animated adventure comedy film directed by Jinming Lu and Jinhui Lu. The film was released on July 10, 2015. The film is part of the GG Bond film series, following GG Bond 2 (2014), and followed by GG Bond: Guarding (2017).

Voice cast
Shuang Lu
Zhirong Chen
Qing Zu 
Jingwei Xu
Yi Chen
Ping Wang
Bo Sun

Main Characters 
GG Bond, the main character, wears a red suit with a yellow pig snout icon in the middle.

Super Q, the muscular pig with a blue suit with yellow.

Phoebe, The pig with short blond hair and a pink dress and bow.

SDaddy, the one in green and white with a snot out of his nose.

Bobby, the pig in blue and shiny violet sunglasses. Super G's sidekick.

Reception
The film earned  at the Chinese box office.

References

2010s adventure comedy films
2015 films
2015 computer-animated films
Animated adventure films
Animated comedy films
Chinese animated films
Animated films based on animated series
2015 comedy films